The following outline is provided as an overview of and topical guide to Madagascar:

Madagascar – sovereign island nation located in the Indian Ocean off the southeastern coast of Africa.  The Island of Madagascar is the fourth-largest island in the world, and is home to 5% of the world's plant and animal species, of which more than 80% are endemic to Madagascar. They include the lemur superfamily of primates, the carnivorous fossa, three bird families and six baobab species.

General reference 

 Pronunciation: 
 Common English country name:  Madagascar
 Official English country name:  The Republic of Madagascar
 Common endonym(s):  
 Official endonym(s):  
 Adjectival(s): Malagasy
 Demonym(s):
 International rankings of Madagascar
 ISO country codes:  MG, MDG, 450
 ISO region codes:  See ISO 3166-2:MG
 Internet country code top-level domain:  .mg

Geography of Madagascar 

Geography of Madagascar
 Madagascar is: a megadiverse island country
 Location:
 Eastern Hemisphere and Southern Hemisphere
 Africa (off its east coast)
 East Africa
 Southern Africa
 Indian Ocean
 Time zone:  East Africa Time (UTC+03)
 Extreme points of Madagascar
 High:  Maromokotro 
 Low:  Indian Ocean 0 m
 Land boundaries:  none
 Coastline:  Indian Ocean 4,828 km
 Population of Madagascar: 19,683,000  - 55th most populous country
 Area of Madagascar: 587,041 km2
 Atlas of Madagascar

Environment of Madagascar 

 Climate of Madagascar
 Climate change in Madagascar
 Deforestation in Madagascar
 Illegal logging in Madagascar
 Ecoregions in Madagascar
 Geology of Madagascar
 Protected areas of Madagascar
 Biosphere reserves in Madagascar
 National parks of Madagascar
 Wildlife of Madagascar
 Fauna of Madagascar
 Birds of Madagascar
 Mammals of Madagascar

Natural geographic features of Madagascar 

Landforms of Madagascar
 Glaciers in Madagascar: none 
 Mountains of Madagascar
 Volcanoes in Madagascar
 Rivers of Madagascar
 World Heritage Sites in Madagascar

Regions of Madagascar

Ecoregions of Madagascar 

List of ecoregions in Madagascar
 Ecoregions in Madagascar

Administrative divisions of Madagascar 

Administrative divisions of Madagascar
 Provinces of Madagascar
 Regions of Madagascar
 Districts of Madagascar

Provinces of Madagascar 

Provinces of Madagascar

Regions of Madagascar 

Regions of Madagascar

Districts of Madagascar 

Districts of Madagascar

Municipalities of Madagascar 

Municipalities of Madagascar
 Capital of Madagascar: Antananarivo
 Cities of Madagascar

Demography of Madagascar 

Demographics of Madagascar

Government and politics of Madagascar 

Politics of Madagascar
 Form of government: semi-presidential representative democratic republic
 Capital of Madagascar: Antananarivo
 Elections in Madagascar
 Political parties in Madagascar

Branches of the government of Madagascar 

Government of Madagascar

Executive branch of the government of Madagascar 
 Head of state: President of Madagascar, Andry Rajoelina
 Head of government: Prime Minister of Madagascar, Christian Ntsay

Legislative branch of the government of Madagascar 

 Parliament of Madagascar (bicameral)
 Upper house: Senate of Madagascar
 Lower house: National Assembly of Madagascar

Judicial branch of the government of Madagascar 

Court system of Madagascar

Foreign relations of Madagascar 

Foreign relations of Madagascar
 Diplomatic missions in Madagascar
 Diplomatic missions of Madagascar

International organization membership 
The Republic of Madagascar is a member of:

African, Caribbean, and Pacific Group of States (ACP)
African Development Bank Group (AfDB)
African Union (AU)
Common Market for Eastern and Southern Africa (COMESA)
Food and Agriculture Organization (FAO)
Group of 77 (G77)
Indian Ocean Commission (InOC)
International Atomic Energy Agency (IAEA)
International Bank for Reconstruction and Development (IBRD)
International Chamber of Commerce (ICC)
International Civil Aviation Organization (ICAO)
International Criminal Court (ICCt)
International Criminal Police Organization (Interpol)
International Development Association (IDA)
International Federation of Red Cross and Red Crescent Societies (IFRCS)
International Finance Corporation (IFC)
International Fund for Agricultural Development (IFAD)
International Labour Organization (ILO)
International Maritime Organization (IMO)
International Monetary Fund (IMF)
International Olympic Committee (IOC)
International Organization for Migration (IOM)
International Organization for Standardization (ISO) (correspondent)

International Red Cross and Red Crescent Movement (ICRM)
International Telecommunication Union (ITU)
International Telecommunications Satellite Organization (ITSO)
International Trade Union Confederation (ITUC)
Inter-Parliamentary Union (IPU)
Multilateral Investment Guarantee Agency (MIGA)
Nonaligned Movement (NAM)
Organisation internationale de la Francophonie (OIF)
Organisation for the Prohibition of Chemical Weapons (OPCW)
Southern African Development Community (SADC)
United Nations Conference on Trade and Development (UNCTAD)
United Nations Educational, Scientific, and Cultural Organization (UNESCO)
United Nations High Commissioner for Refugees (UNHCR)
United Nations Industrial Development Organization (UNIDO)
Universal Postal Union (UPU)
World Confederation of Labour (WCL)
World Customs Organization (WCO)
World Federation of Trade Unions (WFTU)
World Health Organization (WHO)
World Intellectual Property Organization (WIPO)
World Meteorological Organization (WMO)
World Tourism Organization (UNWTO)
World Trade Organization (WTO)

Law and order in Madagascar 

Law of Madagascar
 Cannabis in Madagascar
 Constitution of Madagascar
 Human rights in Madagascar
 LGBT rights in Madagascar
 Law enforcement in Madagascar

Military of Madagascar 

Military of Madagascar
 Command
 Commander-in-chief:
 Forces
 Army of Madagascar
 Navy of Madagascar
 Air Force of Madagascar

Local government in Madagascar 

Local government in Madagascar

History of Madagascar 

History of Madagascar

Culture of Madagascar 

Culture of Madagascar
 Architecture of Madagascar
 Cuisine of Madagascar
 Ethnic groups of Madagascar
 Languages of Madagascar
 National symbols of Madagascar
 Coat of arms of Madagascar
 Flag of Madagascar
 National anthem of Madagascar
 People of Madagascar
 Prostitution in Madagascar
 Public holidays in Madagascar
 Religion in Madagascar
 Christianity in Madagascar
 Hinduism in Madagascar
 Islam in Madagascar
 Women in Madagascar
 World Heritage Sites in Madagascar

Art in Madagascar 
 Cinema of Madagascar
 Literature of Madagascar
 Music of Madagascar

Sports in Madagascar 

Sports in Madagascar
 Football in Madagascar
 Madagascar at the Olympics

Economy and infrastructure of Madagascar 

Economy of Madagascar
 Economic rank, by nominal GDP (2007): 127th (one hundred and twenty seventh)
 Agriculture in Madagascar
 Aquaculture in Madagascar
 Communications in Madagascar
 Internet in Madagascar
 Companies of Madagascar
Currency of Madagascar: Ariary
ISO 4217: MGA
 Health care in Madagascar
 Mining in Madagascar
 Visa policy of Madagascar
 Tourism in Madagascar
 Transport in Madagascar
 Airports in Madagascar
 Driving in Madagascar
 Rail transport in Madagascar

Education in Madagascar 

Education in Madagascar

See also 

Madagascar
Index of Madagascar-related articles
List of international rankings
List of Madagascar-related topics
Member state of the United Nations
Outline of Africa
Outline of geography

References

External links 

 Government
 The Madagascar Government official site
 National Assembly of Madagascar official site (English)
Embassies and Consulates
Canada Hungary Washington DC

 News
 allAfrica.com - Madagascar news headline links
 - Madagascar conservation story

 Overviews
BBC News Country Profile - Madagascar
 CIA World Factbook - Madagascar
 MADAGASIKARA.it many information about madagascar and specially NOSY BE - Madagascar
WildMadagascar.org Overview, news, photos, cultural history.  English and French

 Directories

Stanford University - Africa South of the Sahara: Madagascar directory category
The Index on Africa - Madagascar directory category
University of Pennsylvania - African Studies Center: Madagascar directory category

 Ecology
Madagascar's National Parks and Reserves official park website
Conservation International - Madagascar overview pages
Madagascar Wildlife Conservation MWC is a Malagasy non-profit association, which organises and pursues community-based conservations projects
New York Academy of Sciences Conserving Madagascar - Podcast by Helen Crowley

Madagascar